When Will I See You Again is the title of the fourth studio album by singer-songwriter & producer Thomas Anders. It was released in 1993, and was produced by Ralf Stemmann and Christian De Walden (Amanda Lear). It features a remake of The Three Degrees' classics When Will I See You Again.
I'll Love You Forever, The Love in Me and When Will I See You Again (duet with The Three Degrees) were released as singles.

Marathon Of Life was written by Ralf Stemmann for the Swedish movie "Stockholm Marathon", where Anders played a small part.

I'll Love You Forever was covered by Norwegian singer Wencke Myhre in 1994 and by Filipino trio "Vanna Vanna" in 1995.

Track listing 

 "When Will I See You Again" (Duet With The Three Degrees) (Kenneth Gamble, Leon Huff) – 3:32
 "Dangerous Lies" (Thomas Anders, Margaret Harris, Ralf Stemmann) – 3:44
 "I'll Love You Forever" (Max Di Carlo, Margaret Harris, Christian De Walden, Ralf Stemmann) – 3:46
 "Midnight" (Lisa Catherine Cohen/Romano Musumarra) – 4:04
 "Marathon Of Life" (Margaret Harris, Thomas Anders, Christian De Walden, Ralf Stemmann) – 3:44
 "Is It My Love" (Thomas Anders, Ralf Stemmann, Mike Shepstone) – 3:43
 "The Love In Me" (Werner Hammer, Timothy Touchton, Margaret Harris) – 4:09
 "Stay A Little Longer" (Thomas Anders, Ralf Stemmann, Mike Shepstone) – 3:53
 "Dance In Heaven" (Thomas Anders, Mike Shepstone) – 4:06
 "Shipwrecked" (Thomas Anders, Ralf Stemmann, Mike Shepstone) – 3:49
 "Hold My Hand" (Margaret Harris, Thomas Anders, Markus Krochmann, Christian Blau) – 3:45
 "When Will I See You Again (Unplugged Version)" (Kenneth Gamble, Leon Huff) – 2:59

Personnel 

 Produced and arranged by: Christian De Walden and Ralf Stemmann
 Co-Produced by and engineered by: Walter Clissen
 Recorded at Flamingo Café Recording Studio, Studio City, CA
 Mixed at Enterprise Studios, North Hollywood, CA
 Engineered and mixed by: Walter Clissen, Assisted by John Schmidt
 Digitally mastered by: Brian Gardner at Bernie Grundman Mastering, Hollywood, CA
 Cover-Design : PS Design, Hamburg
 Photos: Dieter Eikelpoth

Musicians 

 Synclavier programming: Ralf Stemmann
 Keyboards: Ralf Stemmann and Randy Kerber
 Acoustic piano: Randy Kerber, Larry Steelman
 Guitars: Tim Pierce
 Acoustic Guitars: Tim Pierce, Paul Jackson Jr.
 Bass: Bob Parr
 Sax and Flute solo: Doug Norwine and Warren Ham
 Horns: "The Heart Attack Horns" Bill Bergman, Greg Smith, Dan Fornero, Dennis Farias and Nick Lane
 Percussion: Paulinho Da Costa
 Stings: "LA Express Strings"
 Background vocals arrangements: Christian De Walden
 Background vocals: Eric Paletti, Warren Ham, Michael Mishaw, Kenny O'Brien, Brandy Jones, Bambi Jones
 The Three Degrees (appears courtesy of BMG/Ariola)

Music videos 

 When Will I See You Again (Duet With The Three Degrees) was released on Thomas Anders – The DVD-Collection.

References

See also 
The Three Degrees – Out of the Past into the Future (1993)

1993 albums
Thomas Anders albums